Vinyl Tap started as a Canadian radio show hosted by Randy Bachman, musician alumnus of the famous Canadian rock bands The Guess Who and Bachman–Turner Overdrive. 

The show ran on CBC Radio from 2005 until 2021, when it was cancelled. In February 2022, it was announced that the show would be returning to the air weekly, Sundays at 9 PM in most markets, beginning March 6, 2022, as a syndicated programme on nearly a dozen Corus radio stations as well as several non-Corus stations. The revived show is co-produced by syndicator Orbyt Media and Corus Entertainment.

48 original episodes air annually, up from the 36 original shows that had been produced annually for CBC. Unlike the CBC version of the show, the Corus production will include commercials but will otherwise have the same format and will retain its two-hour running time. 

In the two-hour program, Randy Bachman plays predominantly classic rock, pop and older jazz music and told stories behind the selections, adding from time to time short musical demonstrations played live, besides frequent personal anecdotes. Musical selections are commonly organized around a theme, sometimes of Bachman's own choosing and sometimes in response to a request submitted by a listener. The program's format somewhat resembles Finkleman's 45s, the program it replaced in June 2005 on the CBC Radio schedule, although Bachman presents a very different range of musical selections than Danny Finkleman did. Some of Bachman's musical stories from the program were published in book form in the fall of 2011.

Until 2011, when they separated, Bachman's wife Denise McCann Bachman also participated in the show, reading listener mail (typically 40 minutes into the first hour), doing fact research and commenting. His son Tal Bachman took over the research for the show, but did not contribute as an on-air personality.

In 2010, Bachman hosted an episode of the show live from the Glenn Gould Studio at the CBC Broadcast Centre in Toronto, Ontario. Titled "Guitarology 101", the episode featured Bachman, McCann, Mick Dalla-Vee and Brent Knudsen talking about various aspects of guitars, including live performances of a number of classic rock and rhythm and blues songs.

When it was a CBC show, CBC Vancouver senior radio producer Tod Elvidge engineered, edited, and compiled each show for broadcast.

In 2021, the CBC announced the cancellation of the show. A farewell special aired on Canada Day, July 1, 2021.

Stations airing the syndicated version of Vinyl Tap in 2022 include:
Q107 Toronto, Ontario
CHOM 97.7 Montreal, Quebec
Cool 106.3 Sarnia, Ontario
Cool 95.1 Chatham-Wallaceburg, Ontario  
Cool 94.5 Wingham, Ontario 
Moose 100.1 Fort St. John, British Colubmia
Q97.9 New Glasgow, Nova Scotia
Q103 Moncton, New Brunswick
Q104 Halifax, Nova Scotia
The Rock Q88.9 Saint John, New Brunswick
Q107 Calgary, Alberta
Big 96.3 Kingston, Ontario
Rock 101 Vancouver, British Columbia
FM96 London, Ontario
Big 101.1 Barrie, Ontario
107.5 Dave Rocks Kitchener-Cambridge-Waterloo, Ontario
Power 97 Winnipeg, Manitoba
Boom 101.9 Cornwall, Ontario
Y108 Hamilton, Ontario
The Chuck 92.5 Edmonton, Alberta
101.5 The Wolf Peterborough, Ontario

References

External links
Vinyl Tap on Q107 Toronto
CBC website
Randy Bachman's Vinyl Tap

CBC Radio One programs
CBC Music programs
Canadian music radio programs
Rock music radio programs
2005 radio programme debuts
Syndicated Canadian radio programs